For the Louisiana political commentator, see Ed Renwick.

Edward Sabine Renwick (1823–1912) was an American mechanical engineer, inventor and patent expert.

Early life
Renwick lost most of his eyesight while working as a patent examiner. He worked for a time in Wilkes-Barre as an ironmaster, but failed.

Family connections
His father, James Renwick, Sr., was a Professor of chemistry and physics at Columbia University. His mother, Margaret, was a member of the Brevoort family of New York.
One brother, James Renwick, Jr., was a leading US architect, designer of St. Patrick's Cathedral, Grace Church, Vassar College, the Smithsonian Institution and the Croton Aqueduct. The other, Henry, was a former steamboat inspector and co-author with his father. His grandmother Jean Jeffrey/Jeannie Jaffray of Lochmaben was the Blue-Eyed Lassie mentioned in Robert Burns' poem I gaed a waefu' gate yestreen. Charles Wilkes was an uncle of his.

Edward Renwick married Elizabeth Anne Brevoort in 1862.

Inventions
Renwick formulated at least 25 inventions over his lifetime, including a combination chicken brooder and incubator, and a self-binding reaping machine. He sued Cyrus McCormick over royalties, but was awarded none.

His patent dates stretch from 1850 (age 27) to 1904 (age 81).

Great Eastern
One of his greatest achievements was the designing and supervising, with his brother Henry, of a repairing of a break in the bilge of the Great Eastern steamship with a floating caisson, clamped to the hull.

Later life
He later settled in Millburn, New Jersey in 1867. He built a large Victorian mansion at 140 Old Short Hills Road which stood until 2001. He died there in 1912 at the age of 89.

Notes

Sources
 Renwick Family Letters and Manuscripts 1794-1916
 A History of Millburn Township by Marian Meisner, Chapter XVIII
 History of the Atlantic Cable & Undersea Communications Great Eastern by Bill Glover
 James Dugan, The Great Iron Ship, 1953 , pgs 149-155
 Black, George Fraser, Scotland's Mark on America, 1921

Resources
 
 Renwick, Edward S. (1893). Patentable invention (PDF). Rochester, N.Y. 168 pages.

American mechanical engineers
19th-century American inventors
1823 births
1912 deaths